Border Cop is a 1979 crime action film directed by Christopher Leitch and starring Telly Savalas. Savalas plays a United States Border Patrol agent who has a close run-in with a dangerous organized crime boss. The film is distributed by Troma Entertainment.

Tagline: Where the law crosses the line.

The film is rated R13 in New Zealand and it contains violence and content that may disturb.

Cast
 Telly Savalas - Frank Cooper 
 Danny De La Paz - Benny Romero 
 Eddie Albert - Moffat 
 Michael V. Gazzo - Chico Suarez 
 Cecilia Camacho - Leina Romero 
 Robin Clarke - Officer Eddie Hale

References

External links
 
 Border Cop at Troma.com 

1979 films
1970s crime action films
1970s action thriller films
Films about illegal immigration to the United States
Troma Entertainment films
Films scored by Stanley Myers
1970s English-language films
Films directed by Christopher Leitch
American crime action films
American action thriller films